Bouconville-Vauclair is a commune in the French department of Aisne, administrative region of Hauts-de-France (Picardy as historical region), northern France.

Geography
The river Ailette flows west through the commune.

Population

See also
 Communes of the Aisne department
 The works of Maxime Real del Sarte

References

Communes of Aisne
Aisne communes articles needing translation from French Wikipedia